Ana Cláudia Bolzan (born 15 July 1996) is a Brazilian handballer for EC Pinheiros and the Brazilian national team.

Titles
Pan American Women's Club Handball Championship: 2017
South and Central American Women's Club Handball Championship: 2022

Individual awards
2022 South and Central American Women's Club Handball Championship: All star team left wing

References

1996 births
Living people
Brazilian female handball players
Handball players at the 2014 Summer Youth Olympics
21st-century Brazilian women
Competitors at the 2018 South American Games
Competitors at the 2022 South American Games
South American Games gold medalists for Brazil
South American Games medalists in handball